The  Nippon Professional Baseball season ended with the Yomiuri Giants defeating the Seibu Lions in the 2002 Japan Series 4 games to 0.

Standings

Central League

Pacific League

Japan Series

League leaders

Central League

Pacific League

See also
2002 Major League Baseball season

References